Bradley Ian Abbott (born 24 December 1994) is an English professional footballer who plays as a midfielder for Boston United.

Playing career
Abbott began his career at Barnsley, from where he was loaned out to Harrogate Town in November 2013. He played seven Conference North and cup game for the club before returning to Barnsley after picking up a back injury. He signed a new contract with the "Tykes" in May 2014. In March 2016 he signed for Barrow on loan until the end of the season.

On 12 May 2016, Abbott was released by Barnsley.

Statistics

References

External links

1994 births
Living people
English footballers
Association football midfielders
Harrogate Town A.F.C. players
Barnsley F.C. players
Chester F.C. players
Barrow A.F.C. players
Buxton F.C. players
Boston United F.C. players
Spennymoor Town F.C. players
National League (English football) players
English Football League players
Northern Premier League players